Saint-Pardoux-le-Lac (Limousin: Sent Perdos dau Lac) is a commune in the Haute-Vienne department in the Nouvelle-Aquitaine region in west-central France. It was established on 1 January 2019 by merger of the former communes of Roussac (the seat), Saint-Pardoux and Saint-Symphorien-sur-Couze.

See also
Communes of the Haute-Vienne department

References

Saintpardouxlelac